Lily Chanu Paonam is an Indian Archer .She won a silver medal in the 2017 World Archery Championships.

References

Living people
Indian female archers
Archers at the 2014 Asian Games
Year of birth missing (living people)
Place of birth missing (living people)
Asian Games competitors for India